Myths and Legends of Babylonia and Assyria is a book by Donald Alexander Mackenzie published in 1915.  The book discusses not only the mythology of Babylonia and Assyria, but also the history of the region (Mesopotamia), biblical accounts similar to the region's mythology, and comparisons to the mythologies of other cultures, such as those of India and northern Europe.

External links 

Myths and Legends of Babylonia and Assyria (entire text)

1915 books
Middle Eastern mythology